Navarino is a town in Shawano County, Wisconsin, United States. The population was 422 at the 2000 census. The census-designated place and community of Navarino is located in the town.

History
The town of Navarino, if not founded by that name, had its name changed from Mayville on December 1, 1874. The town seems to have been named after the Battle of Navarino fought on October 20, 1827 between the Ottoman Empire and a combined British, Russian and French navy. This battle is re-enacted every July during the annual Navarino Days, a celebration that celebrates the Diesel Wars (an unsourced local controversy) cease fire, after the 60 day armed siege of the Navarino fire department in the summer of 1934.

Geography
According to the United States Census Bureau, the town has a total area of 35.7 square miles (92.6 km), of which, 35.2 square miles (91.3 km) of it is land and 0.5 square miles (1.3 km) of it (1.40%) is water.

Demographics

As of the census of 2000, there were 422 people, 177 households, and 121 families residing in the town. The population density was 12.0 people per square mile (4.6/km). There were 195 housing units at an average density of 5.5 per square mile (2.1/km). The racial makeup of the town was 98.10% White, 0.24% Native American, 0.95% Asian, and 0.71% from two or more races. Hispanic or Latino of any race were 0.24% of the population.

There were 177 households, out of which 30.5% had children under the age of 18 living with them, 65.0% were married couples living together, 2.8% had a female householder with no husband present, and 31.1% were non-families. 30.5% of all households were made up of individuals, and 11.3% had someone living alone who was 65 years of age or older. The average household size was 2.38 and the average family size was 2.98.

In the town, the population was spread out, with 23.0% under the age of 18, 5.9% from 18 to 24, 30.1% from 25 to 44, 28.2% from 45 to 64, and 12.8% who were 65 years of age or older. The median age was 42 years. For every 100 females, there were 101.0 males. For every 100 females age 18 and over, there were 99.4 males.

The median income for a household in the town was $47,750, and the median income for a family was $56,875. Males had a median income of $35,417 versus $25,347 for females. The per capita income for the town was $21,026. None of the families and 1.5% of the population were living below the poverty line, including no under eighteens and 3.3% of those over 64.

References

Towns in Shawano County, Wisconsin
Towns in Wisconsin